Lake Austin is an ephemeral salt lake located in the Mid West region of Western Australia, approximately  south of Cue and  north of Mount Magnet. It is named after Robert Austin, who explored the area around the lake in 1854. The abandoned town of Austin is located on an island in the lake. The Great Northern Highway passes through this island as it crosses the lake. Lake Austin is also the name of the locality surrounding it.

The lake itself lies in a basin covering , or  excluding the many islands. The lake usually fills in response to heavy rainfall in the summer and autumn; anecdotally, this occurs twice about every ten years. Water salinity varies according to lake levels: recorded values have ranged from 44.8 mS/cm during a flooding event in 2000, to 164 mS/cm in the late 1970s. The lake bed is flat, variably crusted with salt, and devoid of vegetation. It is surrounded by a salt marsh dominated by the samphire species Tecticornia fimbrata, Tecticornia halocnemoides and Tecticornia pruinosa.
The catchment area is composed of gently undulating saline stony plains with associated internal drainage lines and several scattered drainage foci.

The main land uses around Lake Austin are mining and pastoralism. A large deposit of gypsum sand is located on the edge of the lake. From 1999 to 2002, hypersaline groundwater from the Cuddingwarra gold mine was discharged into Lake Austin. The Austin Downs pastoral station covers part of the lake. Sheep are grazed in the area and feral goats and donkeys are abundant.

See also

References

Lakes of the Mid West (Western Australia)
Saline lakes of Western Australia